Thililua is a genus of polycotylid plesiosaur, containing one species, T. longicollis.

Discovery
The name Thililua is derived from that of an ancient aquatic god from local Berber mythology; longicollis refers to the animal's long neck. Thililua has been found in Late Cretaceous (early Turonian) rocks in the High Atlas mountains of Morocco in north Africa. Thililua is the first Polycotylid plesiosaur discovered in Africa, and also the first discovered that lived at a subtropical latitude. In 2010, Thililua was transferred to Leptocleididae as a sister taxon to Nichollssaura.

Description

The type specimen of T. longicollis, which was described in 2003, consists of an almost complete skull and lower jaw, articulated with 37 vertebrae. Of these vertebrae, 30 were cervical (neck) vertebrae, which is an unusually high number compared to other Polycotylids, such as Dolichorhynchops, which had only 19 neck vertebrae, and Polycotylus, which had 26. It is believed to be an adult specimen, since some of the cranial sutures are very difficult to distinguish. Using comparisons with the head and neck length to body length ratio of a related genus, Dolichorhynchops, the estimated total length of Thililua was 5.5 to 6 metres.

See also

 List of plesiosaur genera
 Timeline of plesiosaur research

References

Fossils of Morocco
Late Cretaceous plesiosaurs
Plesiosaurs of Africa
Polycotylids
Fossil taxa described in 2003
Sauropterygian genera